National nature reserves in Hampshire in England are established by Natural England and managed by them or by non-governmental organisations such as the Royal Society for the Protection of Birds or the National Trust.

List of reserves

Ashford Hangers NNR
Ashford Hill NNR
Beacon Hill NNR
Butser Hill NNR
Castle Bottom NNR
Kingston Great Common NNR
Martin Down NNR
Keyhaven, Pennington, Oxey and Normandy Marshes or North Solent NNR
Old Winchester Hill NNR
Titchfield Haven NNR

Other national nature reserves in England
National nature reserves in England
Natural England

References

 Hampshire
Nature reserves in Hampshire